The turquoise-throated barbet (Psilopogon chersonesus) is an Asian barbet found in Thailand. The barbets get their name from the bristles which fringe their heavy bills; this species eats fruits and insects.  It used to be considered a subspecies of the blue-throated barbet.

References

turquoise-throated barbet
Birds of Thailand
Birds of the Malay Peninsula
turquoise-throated barbet
turquoise-throated barbet

Endemic fauna of Thailand